The rah-rah (or ra-ra) skirt is a short flounced layered skirt that originated in cheerleading and became a popular fashion trend among teenage girls in the early 1980s. As such it marked, as the Oxford Dictionary noted, the first successful attempt to revive the miniskirt that had been introduced in the mid-1960s. It was created by Angela Stone and Gifi Fields, who based the idea on creating a tutu out of heavier fabric. Later in the 1980s it was often worn with leather, denim or lace.  

The mini regained popularity in the 1990s on its own, largely eschewing the rah-rah's frills. The latter eventually made a comeback in Britain in 2008, proclaiming that "Eighties look is all the ra-rave."

Examples of the rah-rah were to be seen on the covers of music albums such as Since Yesterday by Strawberry Switchblade (1984).

Etymology

Rah-rah is a reduplication of an abbreviation for "hurrah", which is used as a synonym for "cheering".

History
While the rah-rah skirt first originated in cheerleading, they were introduced to mainstream fashion in 1982. It was popular in the 1980s, until the mini skirt went back into popularity, but it made a resurgence in 2008.

See also
 Miniskirt

Notes

1980s fashion
Skirts

Women's clothing